Cécile Cinélu-Aholu (born 4 June 1970 in L'Hay-les-Roses, France) is a retired French athlete who specialised in the 100 metres hurdles. She competed at the 1992 Summer Olympics and 1996 Summer Olympics.

Her personal bests are 12.88 seconds in the 100 metres hurdles (-0.3 m/s, Stuttgart 1993) and 8.02 seconds in the 60 metres hurdles (Liévin 1993).

Competition record

National 
French National Athletic Championships :
 winner of 100m hurdles in 1996

References 
 
 Docathlé2003, Fédération française d'athlétisme, 2003, p. 395

1970 births
Living people
People from L'Haÿ-les-Roses
French female hurdlers
Olympic athletes of France
Athletes (track and field) at the 1992 Summer Olympics
Athletes (track and field) at the 1996 Summer Olympics
World Athletics Championships athletes for France
Sportspeople from Val-de-Marne
Mediterranean Games silver medalists for France
Mediterranean Games medalists in athletics
Athletes (track and field) at the 1993 Mediterranean Games
20th-century French women